Mümin Çılgın (born 1935) is a Turkish former racehorse jockey, best known for his record winning of nine races at the Gazi Race, Turkey's most prestigious horse racing event.

He was born in 1935 in Tekirdağ. In 1953, he left his hometown to go to Istanbul. However, he entered horse jockeying in Izmir by the William Giraud stable, where he became apprentice to trainer Sedat Evliyazade.

Mümin Çılgın won his first race on May 5, 1956 with the racehorse "Dilamiye" owned by the then prime minister Adnan Menderes. After winning ten races in the same year, he was promoted from apprentice jockey to fully fledged jockey in accordance with the regulations effective at the time.

Following many successful races, he became a master jockey, and was nicknamed "Mümin Hoca" (literally: Master Mümin). Between 1956 and 1999, Mümin Çılgın rod 44 years long racehorses and won nine time the Gazi Race.

In addition, Çılgın won in the years 1957, 1964, 1966, 1968, 1969, 1974, 1975 and 1976 eight times the President's Race, country's second most prestigious horse racing event held at the Ankara 75th Anniversary Race Course.

Mümin Çılgın retired in 1999 from active racehorse riding. However, he is still present in horse racing as a racehorse owner and trainer.

References

1935 births
People from Tekirdağ
Turkish jockeys
Living people